Pseudephemerum is a genus of mosses belonging to the family Dicranaceae.

Taxonomy

Species 
Pseudephemerum caldense (Müll. Hal.) Broth. 
Pseudephemerum laxifolium (Renauld & Cardot) Thér. 
Pseudephemerum nitidum (Hedw.) Loeske 
Pseudephemerum tenellum (Mitt.) Broth.

References

Dicranales
Moss genera